Ashbel Green Simonton (January 20, 1833 – December 9, 1867) was a North-American Presbyterian minister and missionary, the first missionary to settle a Protestant church in Brazil, Igreja Presbiteriana do Brasil (Presbyterian Church of Brazil).

Early life 

Simonton was born in West Hanover, southern Pennsylvania, and spent his childhood on the family's estate, named Antigua. His parents were the doctor and politician William Simonton (elected twice to Congress) and Mrs. Martha Davis Snodgrass (1791–1862), daughter of James Snodgrass, a Presbyterian minister, who was the pastor of the local church. Ashbel was named after Ashbel Green, president of New Jersey College. He was one among nine brothers and sisters. The boys (William, John, James, Thomas and Ashbel) used to call themselves the "quinque fratres" (five brothers). One of his brothers, James Snodgrass Simonton, four years older than Ashbel, was also a missionary to Brazil, spending three years as a teacher in the city of  Vassouras, in the state of Rio de Janeiro. One of his four sisters, Elizabeth Wiggins Simonton (1822–1879), also called Lille, married the Presbyterian minister and missionary Alexander Latimer Blackford, a colleague of Simonton in Brazil and the co-founder of the Igreja Presbiteriana do Brasil.

Conversion 
In 1846, the family moved to Harrisburg, where Simonton finished high school. After graduating in New Jersey College (the future Princeton University), in 1852, he spent about a year and a half in Mississippi, working as a teacher for young boys. Disappointed with the lack of attention by the local authorities for teaching, Simonton went back to Pennsylvania and tried to become a lawyer, although by that time many people would advise him to become a minister, something to which his mother had consecrated him at his birth. In 1855 he had a deep religious experience during a revival and went to the Princeton Seminary. In his first term, he heard in the seminary's chapel a sermon by Dr. Charles Hodge, one of his teachers, which moved him to the missionary work in foreign lands. He was ordained in 1859 and arrived in Brazil on August 12, the same year.

Ministry 
Soon after organizing the Presbyterian church in Brazil (January 12, 1862), Simonton spent his vacation in the United States, where he married Helen Murdoch, in Baltimore. They came back to Brazil in July 1863. In the next year they became parents to Helen Murdoch Simonton, Simonton’s only daughter.

Besides the Presbyterian Church, Simonton created a newspaper, Imprensa Evangélica (1864), along with a presbytery (1865) and a seminary (1867).

Death

In 1867, feeling ill, Simonton went to São Paulo, where his sister and brother-in-law were raising his daughter. Simonton died on December 9, 1867, victim of Malaria.

External links
 Sons of the Prophets: Leaders in Protestantism from Princeton Seminary

1833 births
1867 deaths
Presbyterian missionaries in Brazil
American Presbyterian missionaries
People from Dauphin County, Pennsylvania
Princeton University alumni
American expatriates in Brazil